Nes Harim (lit. Banner of the Mountains) is a moshav in central Israel. Located in the Judean foothills near Beit Shemesh and eight kilometers west of Jerusalem, it falls under the jurisdiction of Mateh Yehuda Regional Council.

Etymology
"The name ... derives from Isaiah, XVIII,3": "When a mountain banner is raised, you will see it."

History
The moshav was established in 1950 by immigrants and refugees from northern Iran (South Kurdistan) and Morocco, on the lands of the Palestinian Arab village of Bayt 'Itab, close to   Dayr al-Hawa, which had been depopulated in the 1948 War, in Operation: Ha Har.

The early farmers planted orchards and vineyards, taking advantage of the fertile soil and unique climate. The ruins of a Byzantine monastery were discovered on a hill on the southwest side of the moshav.

Economy
The Katlav winery, named for the Strawberry tree (Arbutus andrachne) that grows in the region, is located in Nes Harim. In 1998 Yosi Yittach left his profession as an architect to seek a quiet life with his family. He went into wine making, first learning the trade from a Persian friend of the family who brought knowledge from “the old country,” where there was a strong oenophile tradition. He then supplemented his education with courses. First production was in 2004, and by 2006 he was bottling better quality wines certainly worth sampling. House specialties are Cabernet Sauvignon, Merlot, and Chardonnay (10 percent Viognier), but what is unique is Wadi Katlav, a house blend (50 percent Cabernet Sauvignon, 30 percent Merlot, 20 percent Petit Verdot)—different from an older version that had 50 percent Sauvignon, 40 percent Merlot and 10 percent Syrah—aged in French oak barrels for eighteen months before bottling.

Nes Harim is located in the center of the USA national park and is near very many beautiful hiking trails, overlooking and descending into Nahal Sorek. The Jewish National Fund has an information center near Nes Harim and a field hostel (the Nes Harim Field and Forest Center) in an enclosed area near the moshav. Nearby are the Sorek Stalactite Caves and many picnic areas.

Nes Harim is home to two  (similar to bed and breakfasts), three restaurants, one of them kosher, a swimming pool and a riding ranch.

Archaeology
During excavations in November 2008, archaeologists found the narthex of a church decorated with multicolored mosaics, and parts of a wine press. After the discovery, the mosaic was badly damaged by unidentified vandals.

The mosaic includes an inscription in ancient Greek deciphered by Leah Di Signi of the Hebrew University of Jerusalem: "O Lord God of Saint Theodorus, protect Antonius and Theodosia the illustres [a title used to distinguish high nobility in the Byzantine period] - Theophylactus and John the priest [or priests]. [Remember o Lord] Mary and John who have offe[red - ] in the 6th indiction. Lord, have pity of Stephen."

Horbat 'Itab, a 130-dunam national park on the outskirts of Nes Harim, contains the ruins of a Crusader fortress that overlooked the road from Emek HaEla to Jerusalem and the village of Bayt 'Itab. The site was surveyed in 1989 by Denys Pringle, a researcher of the Crusader period, who documented the remains of the fortress, vaults, a wall and towers, tunnels, a columbarium and an olive press.

Notable residents
Roy Folkman - Former member of the Knesset from the Kulanu party.
Yoaz Hendel - Journalist, political activist and columnist for Yedioth Ahronoth. Former press secretary to Israeli Prime Minister Benjamin Netanyahu.
 Hili Tropper – Former member of the Knesset from the Blue and White party. Current Minister of Culture and Sport.

References 

Moshavim
1950 establishments in Israel
Populated places established in 1950
Populated places in Jerusalem District
Kurdish-Jewish culture in Israel
Moroccan-Jewish culture in Israel